Jamaica competed at the 2016 Summer Olympics in Rio de Janeiro, from August 5 to 21, 2016. This marked its sixteenth Summer Olympic appearance as an independent nation, although it had previously competed in four other editions as a British colony, and as part of the West Indies Federation.

Jamaica Olympic Association sent its largest ever delegation to the Games, with 56 athletes, 25 men and 31 women, competing only in track and field, swimming, diving, and artistic gymnastics, which marked the country's Olympic debut in Rio de Janeiro.

Heading the list of athletes on the Jamaican roster were sprint superstars Usain Bolt, who was looking to successfully defend his 100 m, 200 m, and 4 × 100 m relay titles (referred to as "treble treble"), and Shelly-Ann Fraser-Pryce, who was hunting for her third consecutive title in the women's 100 metres, and eventually acted as the nation's flag bearer in the opening ceremony. Apart from Bolt and Fraser-Pryce, several Jamaican athletes had past Olympic experience, including former champion Veronica Campbell-Brown in the women's 200 metres, Bolt's sprint teammates Asafa Powell and Yohan Blake, and four-time Olympians Novlene Williams-Mills (women's 400 metres) and swimmer Alia Atkinson.

Jamaica left Rio de Janeiro with a total of 11 medals (6 gold, 3 silver, and 2 bronze), matching its overall tally from the 2008 Summer Olympics in Beijing; all of these medals were awarded to the track and field athletes. In his fourth and final Olympics, Bolt successfully completed a set of three consecutive titles across the 100 m, 200 m, and 4 × 100 m relay races, making him one of the most decorated Olympians of all-time in the track and field. Moreover, he joined Carl Lewis and Paavo Nurmi as the only athletes to establish a record of nine gold medals in the sport. Fraser-Pryce witnessed her three-peat bid come to an end, as her compatriot Elaine Thompson beat out the defending champion to run away with a gold in the women's 100 m. Other medalists also included Omar McLeod, who became the first Jamaican to successfully earn the men's 110 m hurdles title, and Williams-Mills, who anchored the Jamaican squad for a runner-up finish in the women's 4 × 400 m relay, adding a silver to her career tally of three bronze medals that she previously collected in three consecutive Olympics.

Medalists

Athletics (track and field)

Jamaican athletes have so far achieved qualifying standards in the following athletics events (up to a maximum of 3 athletes in each event):

The full Jamaican track and field team was announced on July 11, 2016, including sprinting superstars and defending Olympic champions Usain Bolt (men's 100, 200, and 4 × 100 m relay) and Shelly-Ann Fraser-Pryce (women's 100 m).  When the team was named in many events, four athletes were named "including alternates."  The ambiguity of the team composition is to accommodate Usain Bolt, perhaps the biggest celebrity in the sport of athletics. Bolt suffered a grade one hamstring tear during the Jamaican Olympic Trials and pulled out of the final 100 metres race.  After filing for a medical exemption, Bolt was added to the Olympic team, pending his proof of fitness at a meet later in July.  Bolt ran a sub-20 second 200 metres at that meet, the London Grand Prix, so it is presumed he established his fitness and will defend his titles.  Also on the list of entrants were London 2012 bronze medalist Hansle Parchment (men's 110 m hurdles), Janieve Russell (women's 400mh) and Elaine Thompson (women's 200 m), even though they did not compete at the trials.  Keeping the pattern, several other fourth-place finishers were added to the list.

Track & road events
Men

Women

Field events
Men

Women

Diving
 
For the first time since the 1972 Summer Olympics, Jamaica has entered one diver into the Olympic competition by virtue of a top 18 finish at the 2016 FINA World Cup.

Gymnastics

Artistic
Jamaica has entered one artistic gymnast for the first time into the Olympic competition. Toni-Ann Williams had claimed her Olympic spot in the women's apparatus and all-around events at the Olympic Test Event in Rio de Janeiro.

Women

Swimming

Jamaican swimmers have so far achieved qualifying standards in the following events (up to a maximum of 2 swimmers in each event at the Olympic Qualifying Time (OQT), and potentially 1 at the Olympic Selection Time (OST)):

See also
Jamaica at the 2015 Pan American Games
Jamaica at the 2016 Winter Youth Olympics

References

External links 

 

Nations at the 2016 Summer Olympics
2016
Olympics